The Kinston Professional Baseball Hall of Fame was established to honor those who have made a significant contribution to professional baseball in Kinston, North Carolina. Inductions usually occur during a "hot stove" banquet in late January or early February. There were four inductees in the initial class of 1983. There were no inductees in 1986 or 1987. Grady Little was elected in 2000 but could not be inducted until 2001 due to a snow storm.

Following each person's name is the year of induction in the Hall of Fame:
Jesse Barfield (1990)
Steve Blass (1997)
Bobby Bragan (1998)
Sean Casey (2009)
Pat Crawford (1983)
Cecil Fielder (1994)
Lou Gorman (1985)
Johnny Goryl (2002)
Mike Hargrove (1992)
Charlie Keller (1983)
Clyde King (1999)
Ray Kuhlman (1989)
Grady Little (2001)
Carl Long (2003)
Gordon Mackenzie (2005)
Leo Mazzone (1993)
John McLaren (1991)
Charles Nagy (2004)
Sam Narron (1988)
Chad Ogea (2008)
Pete Peterson (1984)
Jim Price (1995)
Jay Schroeder (1996)
Stan Spence (1983)
George Suggs (1983)
Eric Wedge (2007)
Rocket Wheeler (2006)

See also
Kinston Indians

Baseball museums and halls of fame
Halls of fame in North Carolina
Awards established in 1983
Baseball in North Carolina